The Mexican Railway (Ferrocarril Mexicano)  was one of the primary pre-nationalization railways of Mexico. Incorporated in London in September 1864 as the Imperial Mexican Railway (Ferrocarril Imperial Mexicano) to complete an earlier project, it was renamed in July 1867 after the Second French Empire withdrew from Mexico.

History

The main line from Mexico City to Veracruz was dedicated on January 1, 1873 by President Sebastián Lerdo de Tejada; branches connected Ometusco to Pachuca and Apizaco to Puebla.  The  between Esperanza and Paso del Macho were electrically operated beginning in the 1920s.

The Mexican Railway remained independent of the government-owned Ferrocarriles Nacionales de México (National Railways of Mexico) until the government gained control in June 1946 and merged the property in March 1959. Following privatization in the 1990s, Ferrosur acquired the lines of the former Mexican Railway.

References

External links
 

Defunct railway companies of Mexico
History of the State of Mexico
History of Puebla
History of Veracruz
Transportation in Hidalgo
Transportation in the State of Mexico
Transportation in Mexico City
Transportation in Puebla
Transportation in Tlaxcala
Transportation in Veracruz
Railway companies established in 1867
1867 establishments in Mexico
Railway lines opened in 1873
Railway companies disestablished in 1959